Gorno may refer to:

 Gorno, a comune (municipality) in the Province of Bergamo in the Italian region Lombardy
 "Gorno", a combination of the words "gore" and "porn" used to describe a type of splatter film